
Gmina Stare Czarnowo is a rural gmina (administrative district) in Gryfino County, West Pomeranian Voivodeship, in north-western Poland.

The gmina contains part of the protected area called Szczecin Landscape Park.

At the end of November 2007 the mayor of the city of Szczecin, Piotr Krzystek, presented a proposal to incorporate Stare Czarnowo into Szczecin. Eventually, the proposal was not accepted.

Villages
Gmina Stare Czarnowo contains the villages and settlements of Będogoszcz, Binówko, Binowo, Dębina, Dobropole Gryfińskie, Gliniec, Glinna, Kartno, Kołbacz, Kołówko, Kołowo, Komorówko, Małolesie, Modrzewko, Nieznań, Osetne Pole, Stare Czarnowo, Węglino, Żelewo and Żelisławiec.

Neighbouring gminas
Gmina Stare Czarnowo is bordered by the city of Szczecin and by the gminas of Bielice, Gryfino, Kobylanka, Pyrzyce, Stargard and Warnice.

References

Polish official population figures 2006

Stare Czarnowo
Gryfino County